Opsilia aspericollis is a species of beetle from the family Cerambycidae native to Kazakhstan.

References

Beetles described in 1981
aspericollis
Endemic fauna of Kazakhstan